Gopaldi Nazrul Islam Babu College is a private college and located in Gopaldi, Araihazar, Narayanganj. This college was founded in 2010 by the M.P (Member of the Parliament, Narayanganj-2) Md. Nazrul Islam Babu. Therefore, the college was named after him. This institution is also known as GNIBC/Babu college by the local people.

Departments
The college has been listed with three higher secondary department.
 Department of Science 
 Department of Business Studies 
 Department of Humanities

History
Since its founding in 2010, Gopaldi Nazrul Islam Babu College is providing education to its intermediate students. This college was founded by the local M.P. Before the founding of GNIBC, all the local students of Gopaldi and other nearest villages had to travel a long distance to attend college.

Accommodation and transportation
Accommodation for students from far away is available at Gopaldi Nazrul Islam Babu College which is directly managed under the college authority.  Hostel buildings have modern structure with good interior and attached bathroom. Students can order different meal per day as he wants to eat. TV, daily newspaper, CCTV security system & security guards are available at hostel. Hostels are situated inside college campus. Currently 100 students are staying at college hostel.

A full-fledged Transport department functions in the college with buses to provide transport facility to students and staff from various places. This service is offered ensuring a hassle-free and safe transportation and the number of buses will be increased corresponding to the increase in the intake of students.

Location
Nazrul Islam Babu College(GNIBC) is situated at 90°42'east longitude and 23°48' north latitude in Gopaldi, Araihazar Upazila, Narayanganj District, in the capital of Dhaka.

References

Education in Narayanganj
Colleges in Narayanganj District
Private colleges in Bangladesh